This is a list of programmes shown on Disney XD in the UK and Ireland. It does not include those shown only on Disney Channel, Disney Junior and previously Disney Cinemagic and Toon Disney.

Finale programming

Acquired from Disney XD (U.S.)
Big City Greens (18 June 2018 – closure)
Big Hero 6: The Series (30 November 2017 – closure)
DuckTales (4 November 2017 – closure)
Marvel's Spider-Man (July 2017 – closure)
Milo Murphy's Law (September 18, 2017 – closure) 
Star Wars Resistance (2018 – closure)

Reruns

Amphibia (August 5, 2019 - closure)
Gravity Falls (September 7, 2012 – closure)
Lab Rats (April 19, 2012 – closure)
Mighty Med (5 April 2014 - 2016) February 2019 - closure)
Phineas and Ferb (September 2009 – closure)
Randy Cunningham: 9th Grade Ninja (October 4, 2012 – closure)
 Star vs. the Forces of Evil  (2015 - closure)

Other acquired series
Boyster (2014 – closure)
Disney 11 (June 5, 2018 – closure)

Reruns
Dude, That's My Ghost! (2 February 2013 – closure)
Furiki Wheels (2018-closure)
Counterfeit Cat (2016 - closure) (moved to Pop)

Former programming

Disney XD
The 7D
Aaron Stone
American Dragon: Jake Long
Atomic Puppet
Billy Dilley's Super-Duper Subterranean Summer
Camp Lakebottom
Cars Toons
Captain Flamingo
Crash and Bernstein
Fish Hooks
Fort Boyard: Ultimate Challenge
Gamer's Guide to Pretty Much Everything (2015 - 2017)
Guardians of the Galaxy 
Hulk and the Agents of S.M.A.S.H. (2013 - 2018)
I'm In The Band
Inazuma Eleven
Japanizi: Going, Going, Gong!
K.C. Undercover 
Kick Buttowski: Suburban Daredevil (2010–2014; reran in 2019) 
Kickin' It 
Kid vs. Kat (2009–2011)
Lab Rats: Elite Force
Lego Star Wars: The Freemaker Adventures
Star Wars: All-Stars 
Marvel's Avengers Assemble (2014 – 2019)
Mech-X4 
Mega Awesome Super Hacks
Mickey Mouse
Motorcity
My Babysitter's A Vampire
Pac-Man and the Ghostly Adventures
Packages from Planet X
Pair of Kings
Penn Zero: Part-Time Hero 
Pickle and Peanut (2015 - 2017)
Rated A for Awesome (2011 - 2013)
Right Now Kapow (2016 - 2017; 2020)
Shreducation
Supa Strikas (now on Sky Kids)
Star Wars: Rebels (2014–2018)
Stoked
Thunderbirds Are Go
Ultimate Spider-Man
Walk the Prank
Wander Over Yonder (2014–2017)
Zeke and Luther

Jetix
A.T.O.M.
Bobobo-bo Bo-bobo
Chaotic
Combo Niños
Di-Gata Defenders
Dinosaur King
Dork Hunters from Outer Space (now on London Live as part of London Live Kids)
Funky Cops
Galactik Football
Get Ed
Grossology
Huntik
Iggy Arbuckle
Iron Kid
Iron Man: Armoured Adventures
Jimmy Two-Shoes
Lockie Leonard
Magi-Nation
Monster Buster Club (2008 - 2009)
Monster Warriors
Naruto
Oban Star Racers
Pokémon (2008–2014)
PXG
Super Robot Monkey Team Hyperforce Go! (2005–2006)
Team Galaxy
Teenage Mutant Ninja Turtles
Urban Vermin
Viewtiful Joe
W.I.T.C.H.
Yin Yang Yo!

Fox Kids
The Adventures of Sam & Max: Freelance Police
Ace Ventura: Pet Detective
Action Man
The Avengers: United They Stand
Bad Dog
Beast Wars
Big Bad Beetleborgs
Big Wolf On Campus
Biker Mice from Mars (1993)
Billy the Cat
Black Hole High
Braceface
Breaker High
Bumpety Boo
Button Nose
C Bear and Jamal
Camp Candy
Dark Oracle
Delfy and His Friends
Dennis the Menace
Dennis
Diabolik: Track of the Panther
Digimon: Digital Monsters
Diplodos
Donkey Kong Country
Eagle Riders
Eek! The Cat
Eerie, Indiana
Escaflowne
Fantastic Four
The Foxbusters
Flint the Time Detective
G.I. Joe: A Real American Hero 
Gadget and the Gadgetinis
Gogs
Goosebumps
Grimm's Fairy Tale Classics
Gulliver's Travels
Heathcliff
Heavy Gear: The Animated Series
He-Man and the Masters of the Universe
Honeybee Hutch
The Hot Rod Dogs and Cool Car Cats
Huckleberry Finn
Incredible Hulk
Inspector Gadget
Iron Man
Iznogoud
Jackie Chan Adventures
Jayce and the Wheeled Warriors
Jin Jin and the Panda Patrol
The Kids from Room 402
Life with Louie
Lucky Luke
M.A.S.K.
MacDonald's Farm
Mad Jack the Pirate
Martin Mystery
The Marvel Action Hour
Masked Rider
Medabots
MegaMan: NT Warrior (As part of Jetix block)
Mon Colle Knights
Monster Rancher
Mortal Kombat: Defenders of the Realm
Moville Mysteries
Mystic Knights of Tir Na Nog
NASCAR Racers
The New Addams Family
The New Woody Woodpecker Show (2000–2005)
Ninja Turtles: The Next Mutation
Pecola
Peter Pan
Pig City
Pinocchio: The Series
Power Rangers (now on Trace Vault)
Princess Sissi
Rayearth
The Real Ghostbusters
Rimba's Island
RoboCop: The Animated Series
RoboRoach
Robot Wars (Series 7 Only)
Saban's Adventures of the Little Mermaid
Saban's Adventures of Oliver Twist
Saber Rider and the Star Sheriffs 
Sailor Moon
Samurai Pizza Cats
The Secret Files of the Spy Dogs
Shaman King
Shinzo
The Silver Surfer
So Little Time
 Sonic X
Spider-Man
Spider-Man Unlimited
Spider Woman
The Spooktacular New Adventures of Casper
Superhuman Samurai Syber-Squad
The Super Mario Bros. Super Show!
Super Pig
Sweet Valley High
Teenage Mutant Ninja Turtles
Teknoman
Three Little Ghosts
The Tick
Transformers: Robots in Disguise
Ulysses 31  (also on CBBC)
VR Troopers
Walter Melon
What's With Andy?
The Why Why Family
The World of Tosh
Wunschpunsch
X-Men
The Zack Files

See also
 The Walt Disney Company
 Jetix
 Fox Kids

References

External links
 Disney XD Shows

Disney XD (UK and Ireland)
Disney XD original programming
Disney Channel related-lists